Herbert Wadsack (Knittelfeld, February 19, 1912-Vienna, July 15, 2004) was an Austrian librarian and writer.

He was at the Wehrmacht and was a prisoner of war.

He was a member of the Österreichischer Schriftstellerverband and of the PEN International.

Works
 A-To-Nal, 1982
 Bescheidenes Massaker. Kurzprosa aus dreißig Jahren, 1995
 Das Gedichtwerk. , 1995

Poetry books
 Die vor uns sterben, 1946
 Gewaltige Fuge des Lebens, 1966

References

1912 births
2004 deaths
20th-century Austrian writers
People from Knittelfeld
Austrian prisoners of war
Austrian librarians